French Settlement may mean:

For description of French colonization in French Empire
French colonial empires
French colonization of the Americas - French settlement in the New World
 New France - French colony 
Louisiana (New France)
 Canada, New France
 Acadia
 Illinois Country

For the town in Louisiana:
 French Settlement, Louisiana - French settlement in Louisiana

For an early settlement in Oregon:
 French Settlement, Oregon - Renamed long ago to Melrose, Oregon

See also
 French Quarter (disambiguation)
 French Concession
 Frenchtown (disambiguation)